Neferkare Tereru (also Neferkare V) may have been an Eighth Dynasty king of ancient Egypt during the First Intermediate Period. His name is only attested on the Abydos King List (no. 49).

References
VIIth Dynasty 2175 - 2165, Accessed November 9, 2006.
Abydos King List, Accessed November 9, 2006.

22nd-century BC Pharaohs
Pharaohs of the Eighth Dynasty of Egypt
Year of birth unknown
Year of death unknown